During the 2002–03 English football season, Portsmouth competed in the Football League First Division.

Season summary
Portsmouth led the First Division for most of the season, and eventually finished as champions, six points clear of second-placed Leicester City. As champions, Portsmouth gained promotion to the FA Premier League, returning to the top flight after an absence of 15 years.

Bulgarian striker Svetoslav Todorov silenced his critics by finishing top scorer in the division with 26 goals, overhauling Nottingham Forest's David Johnson with a hat-trick against Bradford City on the last day of the season, in the game that confirmed Portsmouth as Football League champions.

Kit
Portsmouth continue to produce their own kits under the club's own brand, Pompey Sport.

Final league table

Results
Portsmouth's score comes first

Legend

Football League First Division

FA Cup

League Cup

First-team squad

Left club during season

Reserve squad
The following players had squad numbers and/or professional contracts but did not make a first-team appearance during the season

Statistics

Starting 11
Considering starts in all competitions
 GK: #1,  Shaka Hislop, 49
 RWB: #30,  Linvoy Primus, 42
 CB: #4,  Hayden Foxe, 31
 CB: #6,  Arjan de Zeeuw, 26
 CB: #35,  Gianluca Festa, 29
 LWB: #14,  Matthew Taylor, 38
 CM: #7,  Kevin Harper, 23
 CM: #10,  Paul Merson, 47
 CM: #11,  Nigel Quashie, 44
 CF: #9,  Svetoslav Todorov, 46
 CF: #17,  Vincent Péricard, 19 (#19,  Steve Stone, also has 19 starts, as a right wing-back)

References

Portsmouth
2002–03